is a Japanese professional footballer who plays as an attacking midfielder for Fagiano Okayama, on loan from Sanfrecce Hiroshima.

Career
Semba started his career at Sanfrecce Hiroshima and played four times in his debut season in 2022 before being loaned out to J2 League club Fagiano Okayama in July of the same year.

Career statistics

Club
.

References

1999 births
Living people
Association football people from Hiroshima Prefecture
Ryutsu Keizai University alumni
Japanese footballers
Japan youth international footballers
Association football midfielders
J1 League players
J2 League players
Sanfrecce Hiroshima players
Fagiano Okayama players